The Australian cricket team toured England in the 1968 season to play a five-match Test series against England for The Ashes. Australia retained The Ashes after the series was drawn 1-1.

The Australian team played 20 first-class matches outside the test series, winning seven games, losing two and drawing the other eleven matches. One game was abandoned without any play and is not included in the figures. They also played four matches which did not have first-class status, winning two and drawing two.

Australian squad
The Australian squad consisted of Bill Lawry (captain), Ian Chappell, Alan Connolly, Bob Cowper, Eric Freeman, John Gleeson, Neil Hawke, John Inverarity, Barry Jarman, Les Joslin, Ashley Mallett, Graham McKenzie, Ian Redpath, David Renneberg, Paul Sheahan, Brian Taber and Doug Walters.

Test series summary

First Test

Second Test

Third Test
{{Two-innings cricket match
| date = 11–16 July 1968
| team1 = 
| team2 = 

| score-team1-inns1 = 409 (172.5 overs)
| runs-team1-inns1 = MC Cowdrey 104 (247)
| wickets-team1-inns1 = EW Freeman 4/78 (30.5 overs)

| score-team2-inns1 = 222 (91 overs)
| runs-team2-inns1 = IM Chappell 71 (180)
| wickets-team2-inns1 = R Illingworth 3/37 (22 overs)

| score-team1-inns2 = 142/3d (42 overs)
| runs-team1-inns2 = JH Edrich 64 (104)
| wickets-team1-inns2 = AN Connolly 2/59 (15 overs)

| score-team2-inns2 = 68/1 (28.2 overs)
| runs-team2-inns2 = RM Cowper 25* (86)
| wickets-team2-inns2 = JA Snow 1/32 (9 overs)

| result = Match drawn
| report = Scorecard
| venue = Edgbaston, Birmingham
| umpires = CS Elliott and H Yarnold
| toss = England won the toss and elected to bat.
| rain = 14 July was taken as a rest day.There was no play on the first day.| notes = 
}}

Fourth Test

Fifth Test

References

Annual reviews
 Playfair Cricket Annual 1969
 Wisden Cricketers' Almanack 1969

Further reading
 Bill Frindall, The Wisden Book of Test Cricket 1877-1978, Wisden, 1979
 Chris Harte, A History of Australian Cricket, Andre Deutsch, 1993
 Ray Robinson, On Top Down Under'', Cassell, 1975

External links
 CricketArchive – tour summaries

1968 in Australian cricket
1968 in English cricket
1968
International cricket competitions from 1960–61 to 1970
1968